Martin County is the name of six counties in the United States:

 Martin County, Florida 
 Martin County, Indiana 
 Martin County, Kentucky 
 Martin County, Minnesota 
 Martin County, North Carolina 
 Martin County, Texas